In Christianity, a schism occurs when a single religious body divides and becomes two separate religious bodies. The split can be violent or nonviolent but results in at least one of the two newly-created bodies considering itself distinct from the other. This article covers schisms in Christianity.

In the early Christian church, the formation of a distinction between the concepts of "heresy" and "schism" began. In ecclesiastical usage, the term "heresy" refers to a serious confrontation based on disagreements over fundamental issues of faith or morality, while the term "schism" usually means a lesser form of disunity caused by organizational or less important ideological differences. Heresy is rejection of a doctrine that a Church considered to be essential. Schism is a rejection of communion with the authorities of a Church.

Definition of schism in Christianity 
In Christian theology, the concept of the unity of the Church was developed by the Apostles, Holy Fathers and apologists. The greatest contribution to the doctrine of church unity was made by the apostles Peter and Paul, Ignatius of Antioch, Irenaeus of Lyons, Cyprian of Carthage, Basil the Great, Gregory the Theologian, John Chrysostom, John of Damascus. Christian ecclesiology insists on the statement that unity and the Church are synonymous, as John Chrysostom wrote: "the name of the Church is not one of separation but of unity and harmony".

Canon 751 of the Latin Church's 1983 Code of Canon Law, promulgated by Pope John Paul II in 1983, defines schism as the following: "schism is the refusal of submission to the Supreme Pontiff or of communion with the members of the Church subject to him". This definition is reused in the Catechism of the Catholic Church.

Schisms in the early Church 

Since the early days of Christianity, many disputes have arisen between members of the Church.

The following are instances of denominations are considered as schisms of Early Christianity by the current mainstream Christian denominations:
 Marcionist schism c.150
 Montanist Schism c.156
 Monarchianist schism c.100-200
 Sabellianist/Patripassianist schism c.200
 Novatianist schism 250 onwards. Novatianism survived until the 8th century.
 Donatist schism c.300-500
 Arian Schism 325
 Quartodecimanist schism 325
 Macedonian Schism 342
 Luciferian Schism 355
 Appolinarist Schism 381
 Collyridianist Schism c.376
 Audianist Schism 380
 Nestorian Schism 431
 Eutychian Schism 451
 Monophysite Schism 451
 Miaphysite Schism 451
 Acacian Schism 484
 Schism of the Three Chapters 553
 Armenian Apostolic Schism 610
 Monothelitist Schism 629
 First Iconoclast Schism 787
 Second Iconoclast Schism 814
 The Great Schism of 1054

Schisms in Catholicism before the Reformation 
 Bosnian Schism 1199
 Waldensian Schism 1215.
 Western Schism 1378

Reformation 
 The Swiss Reformation 1516
 The Anabaptist Reformation 1525
 The English Reformation 1529
 Schism of 1552
 Michael Servetus burned at the stake in 1553, considered founder of Unitarianism
 The Scottish Reformation 1560
 The Dutch Reformation 1571
 The Jansenism schism 1643
 The Raskol schism 1653–66

Post Reformation schisms 
 Melkite-Orthodox Schism 1724
 Orthodox Reformation 19th century
 Restorationist movement begins 1850s
 Bulgarian schism 1872
 Old Catholic Church schism 1879
 Philippine Independent Church 1902
 Liberal Catholic movement 1913
 Liberal Catholic Church schism 1916
 True Orthodox movement 1920s
 Old Calendarism schisms 1923
 Church of the East Schism 1964
 Montaner Schism 1967–69
 Continuing Anglican movement schisms begin since 1977
 Society of Saint Pius X Considered materially schismatic from 1988 until 2005, canonically irregular
 Apostolic Catholic Church 1992
 Second Moscow–Constantinople schism 1996
 Anglican realignment schisms begin since 2002
 The separation of the Anglican Church in North America from the Episcopal Church and the Anglican Church of Canada 2009
 Community of the Lady of All Peoples Quebec Excluded from the Catholic Church in April 2007
 North American Lutheran Church, founded in 2010 by congregations that left the Evangelical Lutheran Church in America and Evangelical Lutheran Church in Canada
 Third Moscow–Constantinople schism 2018
 Global Methodist Church formed by Conservative Methodist who left the United Methodist Church 2022
 Diocese of the Southern Cross formed by Conservative Anglicans who left the Anglican Church of Australia 2022

See also 
 Ecclesiastical separatism
 Old and New Lights

References

Sources

Further reading 
 
 
 
 
 
 

Schisms in Christianity